Hammer Hill Road Sports Ground is a multi-purpose sports ground situated in Diamond Hill, Hong Kong. 

The sports ground comprises one running track (8 lanes, 1400m), 1 turf football pitch with floodlights, 1 small football pitch with floodlights, 1 covered spectator stand with a seating capacity of 2200, 1 car park with 7 parking spaces, 1 fast food kiosk and 3 changing rooms and toilets (for males, females and referees respectively).

References

External links

 - Leisure and Cultural Services Department, Hammer Hill Road Sports Ground

Sports venues in Hong Kong
Football venues in Hong Kong
1989 establishments in Hong Kong